Richard Crudo, A.S.C. is an American cinematographer and director. He is a 6-term past-president of the American Society of Cinematographers.

Life and career 
 
Born and raised in Brooklyn, New York, cinematographer\director Richard Crudo, ASC's lengthy resume includes such notable feature credits as American Buffalo, Outside Providence, American Pie, Down To Earth, Out Cold, Grind and Brooklyn Rules.  Each was singled out in reviews for its excellence in cinematography.

In 2012 he directed the action\horror feature Against the Dark for Sony.  During the following year he wrote, directed and photographed the contemporary crime feature Dirty People.  In addition, he has contributed photography to many popular TV series.  As of March 2022, Mr. Crudo was engaged in shooting the pilot episode of Federal Hill: The Beginning for Executive Producer Terence Winter and long-time collaborator, writer\director Michael Corrente.

Mr. Crudo is a six-term Past President of the American Society of Cinematographers and served for three years as a Governor of the Academy of Motion Picture Arts and Sciences.  He is a frequent guest lecturer at universities across the United States and is a regular contributor to American Cinematographer magazine and other industry publications.  He is also a leading proponent in the industry’s drive to establish standards for digital imaging workflow.

Other professional affiliations include memberships in the Academy of Television Arts and Sciences, the Canadian Society of Cinematographers, the National Film Preservation Board for the Library of Congress, the International Cinematographers Guild and the Society of Motion Picture and Television Engineers.  In 2007 he was made a Fellow of the Royal Photographic Society.  In May 2012, he was invited to become a Canon Camera Explorer of Light.

Professional Affiliations 

Academy of Motion Picture Arts and Sciences
-  Cinematographers Branch Executive Committee, 2003, 2008, 2009, 2015, 2017, 2018, 2019, 2020
-  Chairman, Cinematographers Branch Executive Committee, 2012, 2013
-  Board of Governors, 2011-2014
Academy of Television Arts & Sciences
- Cinematographers Branch

American Society of Cinematographers
-  President, 2003–2006, 2013-2016
-  Board of Governors, 2002–2006, 2007–2010, 2011–2014, 2015-2017, 2019-2022
-  Vice President, 2011, 2012, 2013

Canon Camera Explorer of Light

Digital Cinema Society

International Cinematographers Guild, IATSE Local 600

National Film Preservation Board for the Library of Congress

Royal Photographic Society,
Fellow

Society of Camera Operators,
Associate

Society of Motion Picture and Television Engineers

UCLA Cinematographer-in-Residence
Spring Term 2011

References

External links 
 Official Website
 
 Internet Encyclopedia of Cinematographers - Richard Crudo
 
 
 

Living people
American cinematographers
Year of birth missing (living people)